Sam Groth and Chris Guccione were the defending champions, but chose to compete in the 2015 U.S. Men's Clay Court Championships instead.

Austin Krajicek and Rajeev Ram won the title, defeating Guillermo Durán and Horacio Zeballos in the final, 6–2, 7–5.

Seeds

Draw

Draw

References
 Main Draw

Torneo Internacional Challenger Leon - Doubles
2015 Doubles